Laos developed its culture and customs as the inland crossroads of trade and migration in Southeast Asia over millennia.  As of 2012 Laos has a population of roughly 6.4 million spread over  236,800 km2 (91,400 sq miles), yielding one of the lowest population densities in Asia. Yet the country of Laos has an official count of over forty-seven ethnicities divided into 149 sub-groups and 80 different languages. The Lao Loum have throughout the country's history comprised the ethnic and linguistic majority.  In Southeast Asia, traditional Lao culture is considered one of the Indic cultures (along with Burma, Thailand and Cambodia).
  
Laos is geographically isolated and mountainous, bounded by the Annamite Range in the east, forming a traditional political and cultural boundary with Vietnam (a more Chinese influenced Sinitic culture). Much of the western borders of Laos are formed by the Mekong River which provided the major means of inland trade despite limited navigability along the river's length.  Prior to the 20th century Lao principalities and the Kingdom of Lan Xang extended to the Sipsong Panna (China), Sipsong Chau Tai (Vietnam), and Khorat Plateau (today the northeast of Thailand) where the river was used as a transportation artery to connect Lao peoples on both the right and left banks.  However, the political history of Laos has been complicated by frequent warfare and colonial conquests by European and regional rivals. The history of Laos is unique with a national character defined by its diversity in both culture and customs.

Ethnicity

Laos has an estimated population of 6.5 million. The Lao government recognizes 47 distinct ethnicities, which are further sub-divided into 149 subgroups. Lao society is traditionally categorized into three broad groups based on ethnicity and location.  Approximately 50% of the total population is ethnic Lao (Lao Loum or Lao Tai); 10% are categorized as Lao Theung or “upland Lao” who are predominantly people of Mon or Khmer ancestry; another 34% are Lao Sung or “mountain Lao,” and are also commonly referred to as “hill tribes.” Hill peoples in Laos include the Hmong, Yao (Mien), Akha, and Lahu. Laos is also home to sizeable communities of Vietnamese and Chinese who make up the 6% remaining.

Anthropologists consider the Lao Loum as a subcategory of the wider “Tai” ethnic group who share common genetic, linguistic, and cultural heritage.  The Tai family includes the Lao and Thai, as well as smaller groups which have generally been distinguished by their traditional dress and include the Tai Dam (Black Tai), Tai Daeng (Red Tai), and Tai Khao (White Tai). The Laos to define both the ethnicity and nationality.  Further complication is added by the geopolitical history between Laos and Thailand, there are an estimated 19 million “Lao” speakers living in northeastern Thailand (Thai Isan or Lao Tai) and only 3 million in Laos.  As a consequence identity politics has played a major role in the defining the Lao Loum. The Lao government makes no distinction between the bordering groups and views them as sharing a common identity, but the government of Thailand has through a process known as “Thaification” assimilated the Lao living in Isan. The Lao Loum define themselves based on location, agricultural practice, language and religion. The Lao Loum occupy the Mekong River valleys and cultivate wet rice crops, they are predominantly Theravada Buddhist but have strong syncretism with traditional animist beliefs.

Lao Theung are culturally distinct from both the Lao Loum and Lao Sung. The Lao Theung generally include Mon-Khmer peoples which are among the indigenous peoples from the Mekong River valleys. The largest single group (11% or 500,000 people) is Khmu (Khmou, Kmhmu, Khammu, Khamu, Kammu).  Also included in the Lao Theung population are Katang, Bru, Kui, Laven, Mal, Phai, Katu, Lave, Ngae, Jeh, Khuen, Jeng, Alak, Ir, Kasseng, Khlor, Aheu, Bo, Halang, Doan, Hung, Xinh Mul, Khua, Arem, Bit, Chut, Maleng and Mlabri. The Lao Theung peoples are distinguished by dry rice cultivation, and animist beliefs.

The Lao Sung are commonly known as “hill tribe” peoples, and are generally among the most recent mass populations to migrate into Laos having arrived in the nineteenth century from southern China and Vietnam.  The Hmong are the largest group, which are generally subdivided by traditional dress including the White, Red, Black and Striped Hmong. The Yao (Mien and Lu Mien) are another large group of Lao Sung, and distinguish themselves through the incorporation of Taoist deities with their animist beliefs. Other groups of Lao Sung include the Akha, Kaw, Lahu, Kaduo, Lisu, Hani, Phana, Si La, and Kado.  The Lao Sung were heavily recruited by the United States and its allies during the wars against the communists in the 1960s. As much as 10% of the Lao population and 50% of the Lao Sung population fled the communist takeover of Laos in 1975, and continued during the following decade.  The remaining Lao Sung population has been the target of government suspicion for a low intensity armed conflict since that time.  There are sizeable communities of Hmong in the United States and France.  The Lao Sung are commonly identified by language, dry rice production, slash-and-burn agriculture, traditional opium production and animist beliefs.

Language

There are over 90 distinct native languages spoken by the different ethnic populations of Laos. Lao, the official language of Laos, is a monosyllabic tone based language from the Tai-Kadai family as spoken in Vientiane.  There are 19 million Lao speakers in Thailand and 3 million in Laos, a reflection of geopolitical history.  Lao can be further divided according to regional dialects including Vientiane, northern, northeastern, central and southern. Northern dialects are spoken in Sainyabuli, Bokeo, Phongsali, Luang Nam Tha, Udomxai, and Luang Prabang. Northeastern Lao is spoken mainly in Xiang Khoang and Houa Phan. Central Lao is found in Khammuan and Bolikhamsai. The Southern dialect is used in Champasak, Salavan, Savannakhet, Attapeu, and Sekong.
  
As part of the Tai-Kadai language family spoken Thai is similar to Lao, with some distinctions. Lao has six tones, whereas Bangkok Thai has five, the standard lexicon, grammar, usage and pronunciations are also different.  The two languages are not mutually intelligible, although Lao speakers tend to have an easier time understanding Thai because of the prevalence of Thai radio and media in and around Laos. (cf. Asymmetric intelligibility)

Other major Language families include Austro-Asiatic languages spoken by the Mon-Khmer (Lao Theung) peoples, Hmong-Mien and Burmo-Tibetan (Lao Sung). Chinese and Vietnamese is spoken within their respective ethnic communities.

Among Western languages French is commonly understood among the older (post-colonial) generation, and is still used in limited application for academic and official correspondence. English is quickly being adopted as the language of business and tourism, and is supplanting French among younger generations as the unofficial second language.

Religion

Laos is approximately 66% Theravada Buddhist, which roughly falls along ethnic lines with the majority of practitioners being Lao Loum. The remainder is largely animist, following their unique ethnic traditions and practices. Even among the Lao Loum there is a high degree of syncretism with most Lao acknowledging the traditional animist traditions known collectively as satsana phi.  Other religions are in the minority including Islam and Christianity and represent a combined total of less than 2% of the population.

Buddhism

Theravada Buddhism is central to Lao cultural identity. The national symbol of Laos is the That Luang stupa, a stupa with a pyramidal base capped by the representation of a closed lotus blossom which was built to protect relics of the Buddha.  The shrine has been rebuilt several times since being created in the thirteenth century by the Khmer, with the largest expansions by King Setthathirath in the 1500s as part of a nationwide building campaign.

Traditionally in Laos males would become novice monks at some point in their lives, giving them the opportunity to gain both an education and religious merit (boun).  Laos also has a somewhat unusual belief among Buddhist countries that merit is transferable among people, thus a son or daughter may make merit for a parent by temporarily entering a monastery.   Lay persons are expected to feed and care for the monks of their local community, with the morning processions of monks (tak bat) who walk to collect offerings.  Monks renounce material possessions and labor, thus the community and the monastery (wat) are bound in a mutually reinforcing relationship.

Animism

Animist traditions are also very strong in Laos with the belief in traditional spirits being a common cultural tie among the Lao Loum, Lao Theung and Lao Sung although such beliefs are strictly organized according to local traditions.

Collectively the Lao belief in spirits is referred to as Satsana Phi. Phi are the spirits of buildings or territories, natural places, or phenomena; they are also ancestral spirits that protect people, or can also include malevolent spirits. The phi which are guardian deities of places, or towns are celebrated at festivals with communal gatherings and offerings of food. Many Lao will have a spirit house on or near their property which is an important folk custom used to ensure balance with the natural and supernatural world.

Phi were believed to influence natural phenomena including human illness and so appealing to the phi became an important part of Lao identity and religious health over the millennia. Astrology was a vital part to understanding the natural and spiritual worlds and became an important cultural means to enforce social taboos and customs.

Traditionally the Lao Loum also believed that ancient mythical serpents known as ngueak inhabited major waterways, carving out the surrounding countryside and protecting key points along rivers or other bodies of water. The earliest name for the Mekong River was Nam Nyai Ngu Luang or "Great River of the Giant Serpent."  Ngueak, and the nāga which have been “tamed” by Buddhism, were believed to bring rains, or change shape, and nāga in particular were believed to be protection spirits which inhabited the cities of Vientiane and Luang Prabang in Lan Xang. Nāga have endured as common motifs not only in myth and legend, but also on Lao temples, and silk weavings. Overtime the nāga became a potent symbol of the Kingdom of Lan Xang.

Customs
Lao social structures are comparatively simpler than in neighboring Cambodia or Thailand, which is a logical outgrowth considering the ethnic diversity of Laos. Lao Theung and Lao Sung groups were outside the traditional class structures, but together made up a large portion of the population.

Traditionally the king was at the apex of secular and religious authority, as both the head of the sangha and his saksit power in animist beliefs.  The remainder of the population was headed by a class of nobility and then the general population.  There were no strong caste rules as appeared in Thailand with sakdi na or Khmer based cultures.  Apart from the social structure was the Theravada clergy, which were due respect regardless of class.  The fact the most males became monks at some point in their lives provided a route for social mobility and exposure to formal education.

Since the King of Laos was deposed in 1975, there were early attempts to downplay the importance of the monarchy and replace or alter many religious traditions and holidays. In recent years there has been renewed interest in the monarchy but from a nationalistic perspective, in a similar model to China since the 1990s.  The socialist revolution theoretically put an end to the class distinctions in Laos, but in reality simply transferred traditional structures onto a different set of elite.  The Lao sangha has also recovered their traditional role and status in much of Lao society.

Social Etiquette

Lao social status places an emphasis on respect for elders; religious images and clergy; family and village authority; and the Buddhist concept of dharma which emphasizes personal moral duty.  Buddhist principles encourage stoic indifference and quiet reserve in dealing with disagreements. However, Lao people also have a strong concept of muan or “happy contentment” which encourages actions to not be taken too seriously or too quickly.

The family unit is the basis of much social interaction, as such it is common for Lao to refer to each other using familiar cognates such as “sister, brother, aunt or uncle” without an actual family tie to that person.  Friendship falls between two categories, moo linh “play friends” are acquaintances and moo tai “die friends” who are considered as family. It is not uncommon or even considered rude for moo tai to show up unannounced for an extended stay, or to share personal possessions. Personal face-to-face contact is considered the most polite, and Western notions of invitations, letters and emails are viewed as foreign.

Traditional Lao are conservative about their appearance and personal space. Lao people are also generally sensitive about physical contact.  The head is considered as sacred, whereas the left hand and feet are ritually unclean.  In keeping with social status it is expected that younger people slightly bow or keep their heads lower than elders or clergy.  Except among a parent child relationship it is considered condescending to touch a Lao person's head. Pointing with the hands or fingers is also insulting especially during a disagreement. Positioning of feet is highly important.  Feet should never be pointed toward a Buddha image, member of the clergy, or elders. Shoes should always be removed when entering a temple or a Lao home or will give serious offence.

The typical Lao greeting is the nop which is similar to the wai in Thailand or the satu in Cambodia, and is based on the Indic Añjali Mudrā.  In a nop the hands are clasped together upright in a prayerful position, with fingertips below the nose and a slight downward gaze. The nop is often accompanied with the greeting "Sabaidee" or “good health (to you)” and is considered the polite address for members of higher social status.

Special social attention is paid to monks and religious items.  Touching a Buddha image or animist shrine is always offensive. Lao people will generally nop and kneel when approached by passing monks.  In respect for the monastic vows, it is considered an offence for women to touch a monk, his robes, or to hand anything to a monk directly.  In many instances a male friend or family member will be used as an intermediary or lacking that a plate or some other item will be used and then placed on the ground for the monk to use.  However, compassion is the guiding principle in such interactions and the exception is up to the monk to determine.

Lao social etiquette is extremely complex, and much of it may go unnoticed by a non-Lao.  In the past it was not uncommon for rule books (dtumla) which thoroughly explained social interactions, timing, and which activities which should be undertaken at key times to be used.

Baci Sou Khwan

The baci is the national folk ritual of Laos and the Lao Loum.  The animist ceremony is part of satsana phi, and is used for all major social and life events. The Lao believe the soul has 32 components which can become imbalanced. The baci reinforces the soul and the community, and involves all the gathered into making prayers and well-wishes symbolized by silk or cotton threads which are tied around the wrists.

Literature

Laos takes most of its traditional literature from sixteenth and seventeenth century Lan Xang.  The most notable genre is the epic poetry of which several masterpieces have survived despite Laos’ tropical climate and history of conflict and warfare.

The Sin Xay  follows the mythological tale of a king and his kidnapped sister by the Lord of the Nyak. The Thao Hung Thao Cheuang recounts the struggles of the Khmmu and indigenous peoples of Laos at the time of the Tai migrations as told by their mythical king, and is one of the most important works of literature in Southeast Asia for its depiction of life among its indigenous societies. Other notable works of Lao epic poetry include the rain legends of the Toad King (Phya Khankhaak) which are retold during the annual Rocket Festival, and the story of Phadaeng Nang Ai which is an epic love poem set across multiple reincarnations.

The Lao also have a number of origin legends including the Nithan Khun Borom (Story of Khun Borom) which recounts the creation of the world, and the Nithan Khun Lo which tells how the descendants of Khun Borom settled the lands of mainland Southeast Asia. 
Reflecting Laos’ Theravada Buddhist heritage a number of religious and morality stories are among the most popular in Laos. The national epic of Laos is the Phra Lak Phra Lam and retells the Lao version of the Ramayana  as a previous life of the Buddha.  Also, the Vessantara Jataka is generally considered one of the greatest masterpieces of Lao literature. The story recalls the past life of a compassionate prince, Vessantara, who gives away everything he owns, including his children, thereby displaying the virtue of perfect charity.

Laos has a strong tradition of folklore.  Ghost stories, place legends, stories of naga and trickster tales of Xieng Mieng are quite popular and are the dominant forms of oral tradition.

Art

Laos has experienced several major wars and occupations since the eighteenth century.  Laos holds distinction as the most heavily bombed country in world, as a result of the wars against the communist revolutions in Laos, Vietnam and Cambodia during the 1960s and 1970s. Years of economic isolation have also taken a toll. The international trade in antiquities has also taken a toll on Laos’ artistic heritage due to persistent poverty. As a consequence much of the traditional art and architecture in Laos has been pillaged, stolen, sold, destroyed or suffered significant damage over the past three centuries.

The first attempts at preservation outside the local wat occurred with both French academics working in the early 1900s for the École française d'Extrême-Orient (EFEO), and Prince Phetsarath in the 1950s as part of the early nationalist movement.  International non-governmental organizations geared toward cultural preservation have been allowed to operate since the early 1990s, but are normally connected to a particular ministry or government organization so their activities can be monitored. Most of Laos’ cultural heritage is stored or protected in monasteries throughout the country.  Museums are few, with the Haw Phra Kaew in Vientiane, and the Royal Palace Museum in Luang Prabang housing much of the remaining Lao art and cultural items of significance.

Weaving

Weaving is the dominate form of artistic cultural expression in Laos, it is common across all ethnicities and is the most widely recognized cultural export abroad. Lao mothers will often pass their weaving skills on to their daughters as a sign of eligibility for marriage. Patterns, techniques and colors vary according to region or ethnic group. 
 
Women traditionally raise the silk worms on a constant diet of mulberry leaves, the silk is woven on hand looms in the north or (less commonly) on foot looms in the south.  Each region and ethnic group has their own traditional weaving techniques. In the south weaving is characterized by intricate patterns of elephants, temples, khmer influenced designs and features intricate beadwork.  The northeast is known for using raw silk and cotton, and tye-dying raw silk known as matmii or ikat.  Central Laos runs along the Mekong River and is known for natural indigo dyes and diamond patterns which symbolize the protective scales of the mythical naga.  In the former royal city of Luang Prabang embroidery using delicate gold and silver threads is also preserved.  The art was passed from mother to daughter and both patterns and pieces would be embellished with each passing generation.

Sculpture

Buddhist motifs dominate Lao decorative art forms. Sculpture is among the most prominent form of traditional Lao art.  Sculptures of the Buddha were traditionally cast in bronze, silver, gold or thong which is a gold and silver alloy.  Wooden Buddha images were made by individuals seeking merit are common at the local village level.  The sculptures follow conventional forms and mudras found throughout Theravada Southeast Asia, with two forms being almost unusually Lao in origin.  The most common form is the standing Buddha in a “calling for rain” mudra, with hands at his side in a downward position, and a symmetrical flowing robe on both sides.  Another less common Lao mudra is again standing, with hands crossed in front at the wrists in a “contemplation” mudra.  These images have their origins in the sixteenth century, and are further characterized by longer facial features, and thinner more aquiline noses.

The most culturally and religiously significant sculpture in Laos today is the Phra Bang a gold statue from which the city of Luang Pra Bang takes its name.  According to legend the Phra Bang was cast in Ceylon, transferred to the Khmer Empire and then came north to Lan Xang at the request of Fa Ngum's Khmer queen.  Other historically significant Buddha images include the colossal bronze Buddha images found in Wat Ong Teu and Wat Manorom. Smaller images are also found at the Haw Phra Kaew, and Wat Sisaket in Vientiane or in the many temples like Wat Visoun in Luang Prabang. These Buddha images were produced in Laos and show many of the hallmarks of traditional craftsmanship.

A number of significant Buddha images to Lao history have been lost or taken during the conflicts of the nineteenth and twentieth century.  The most significant is the “Emerald Buddha,” or Phra Kaew, which resides at the Grand Palace in Bangkok as the palladium of Thailand. Similarly the Phra Phutta Butsavarat, or “Crystal Buddha,” was the palladium of the Kingdom of Champasak and was taken to Bangkok in the nineteenth century.  Several other important images which originated in the Kingdom of Lan Na were taken to Laos by King Setthathirath (who was briefly King of Lan Na) in the sixteenth century. These images were crafted for each of his daughters from solid gold, and include the Phra Sae Kham (housed at Wat Pho Chai in Nong Khai, Thailand), Phra Seum (housed at Wat Patum Wanaram, in Bangkok, Thailand), and the Phra Souk.  These images were taken by the Thai armies in the nineteenth century to Isan and were ultimately bound for Bangkok. Ironically the Phra Souk or “Lucky Buddha,” sank in the Mekong during the storm which occurred when the three images were being moved by the Thais, the legend is depicted in murals at the Wat Pho Chai. In Amnat Charoen Province, Thailand the Phra Lao Thep Nimit is another fine example of Lao sculpture which now resides in Thailand.   Other sets of royal Buddha images were lost entirely during the era of French colonialism.  Many were sold or taken as souvenirs, a number of royal images were lost in 1910 when the French gunboat the La Grandiere sank on the Mekong en route to a Paris exhibition.

Woodworking

Laos has a history of sophisticated craftsmanship in wood.  Traditionally used in temples, many homes and government buildings have some richly carved elements today.  Richly carved furniture, elephant howdahs, river barges, and funerary carts can also be found among the private collections of the elite or the Royal collections at the Palace Museum in Luang Prabang.

The first detailed European accounts of exploration to Laos in the sixteenth century described in detail the delicate bas reliefs which were found on the temples and palaces.  Among the most outstanding examples of the craft are found along the temple frieze of Wat Mai, and the royal funerary chapel at Wat Xieng Thong in Luang Prabang.

Folk carvings are also quite popular with votive Buddha images being the most common form, and animist totems being found throughout the areas of the Lao Theung and Lao Sung.

Handicrafts
Lao metalwork in gold and silver is experiencing a resurgence from its high point in seventeenth century Lan Xang. Silver work is especially prized and popular among ethnic minorities including the Hmong and Yao, and can be found as popular elements of traditional dress among married women.

Laos produces a number of handicrafts which use bamboo and other forms of basketry.  Traditionally Lao use intricately woven bamboo mats in homes and temples, although much of the art form has been lost due to the availability and durability of plastic substitutes.  Basketry is quite common and is traditionally seen in various forms of domestic kitchen equipment, or even in the house where bamboo thatching is still commonly used.  
  
Mulberry leaves which are not used for silk worm production are frequently used for the production of saa paper.  Saa paper is a traditional art form which has been incorporated into a number of crafts for the tourist industry around Luang Prabang.

Architecture

Laos has a 21% urban concentration, with the largest city being capital of Vientiane (est. 500,000 population).  The rate of urbanization is growing in Laos but is considerably lower than any of the bordering countries of Vietnam, Thailand or Cambodia. Most of the Lao population is agrarian.

The ancient capital of Lan Xang, which is today's capital of Vientiane, was thoroughly destroyed as a consequence of the Annouvong Rebellion of the 1820s.  As part of French Indochina, the ancient capital was rebuilt as a conscious political statement to both the Lao and Thai of Western power and legitimacy. French building programs extended to Luang Prabang, Savannahket, Xieng Khuang and Pakse as well and many French colonial era buildings can still be found in Lao cities throughout the country.

Most Lao people live in rural villages clustered around a temple (wat). Traditional Lao homes (heuan) are simple, often constructed entirely from woven bamboo thatching or wood, with few rooms. Homes were built on piers or stilts to provide ventilation and protection, and the practice became an important cultural distinction.  According to legend, the first peace agreement between Fa Ngum and the Dai Viet established that Lao lands began where the rivers and streams feed the Mekong and the people live in houses built on stilts. Many modern homes reflect Western, Thai, Chinese, and Vietnamese influence. The use of concrete, stucco, brick and tile is common with constructions since the 1940s.

Religious Architecture
As a devout Buddhist country, stupas and temples are the most culturally significant buildings in Laos. Lao architecture experienced a Golden Age during the sixteenth and seventeenth centuries when many buildings of cultural significance were sponsored by Kings Visoun, Photisarath, and Setthathirath. The most significant buildings include the national symbol of That Luang an important stupa for Buddhist pilgrimage, the Haw Phra Kaew which formerly housed the Emerald Buddha, Wat Sisaket which was built by King Annouvong in the Bangkok style and was spared destruction in the 1820s, and Wat Xieng Thong which was built in 1560 when the capital of Lan Xang was moved to Vientiane.

There are three distinct types of temple construction in Laos depending on the region and the age of the temple. The Luang Prabang style of temple is best exemplified by Wat Xieng Thong, which shows a low sweeping tiered roof.  The Vientiane style of temple is characterized by an open veranda and overhanging tiered roof which have symbolic meaning as levels of Buddhist cosmology, and are crowned by elaborately carved naga at the peak of each roof level. Lastly the Xieng Khouang style is the rarest, due to the extent of fighting which took place in the region during the Lao Civil War. Xieng Khouang style temples are similar to those in Luang Prabang but were often wider and built upon a raised platform with less ornamentation than the other styles.

Lao stupas also have a distinct character, with That Luang being the most recognizable example, but would also include the That Phanom in Isan, Thailand, That Dam in Vientiane, and That Sikhottabong (That Ing Hang) in Thakhek.  Lao stupas are characterized by a pyramidal base with an upward sloping spire which is elongated to represent a closed lotus blossom.  The stupas are significant Buddhist sites of pilgrimage and are customarily built over important religious relics.

Wat Phu is a proto-Khmer site located in Champassak Province, which is more than 1,000 years old. The temple was built around a mountain with a natural formation reminiscent of a Shiva lingam.  The Khmer built two cities on the banks of the Mekong and used the site (approximately 10 km) to create an earthly representation of the Hindu Mt. Meru using both natural and human construction. The site was abandoned as a Hindu place of worship, but over the centuries has become a site of Buddhist pilgrimage.

The old city of Luang Prabang is also a recognized World Heritage Site. Luang Prabang is the most heavily visited city in Laos, and was chosen for both its architectural and artistic heritage in fusing traditional Lao and French colonial architecture. There are more than 30 active temples in Luang Prabang, and was the seat of the Kingdom of Lan Xang from 1353-1560 and the Kingdom of Luang Prabang from 1707-1946.

The stupa That Luang and the Plain of Jars in Xieng Khouang were both nominated for UNESCO status in 1992.  That Luang was nominated for its religious significance as a site of Buddhist pilgrimage and the Plain of Jars for its importance as a major archaeological site of Iron Age culture in Southeast Asia.

Music and performance arts

The national music of Laos is the lam, where a singer (songs by expert singers are mor lam) uses improvised poetry set to quick tempo music around themes of love, difficulty, and poverty using turns of phrases and subtle humor. Lam is highly regional, and many listeners can determine the setting and themes in the first few lines.
 
A popular form of lam is basically a battle-of-the-sexes between an expert male and expert female singer to entertain the audience and trip the opposing singer up using humor, innuendo or stylistic flair.  Lam can also be used in story telling as a sung form of folk poetry, and forms the oral tradition predating the national epics in literature. Lam used in animist traditions creates a type of chant which is used during ceremonies like the baci.

The most integral instrument for Lao music is the khaen a free-reed mouth organ made of bamboo.  Variations on the khaen are found among most ethnic groups in Laos.  Laos also uses a number of classical court instruments which show strong influence from China, Cambodia and Thailand. The ensembles include flutes, zithers, gongs, drums, fiddles, lutes, cymbals and xylophones.  Modern mor lam also includes electric guitars, synthesizers and electric keyboards.

Theater

All traditional theater in Laos is essentially musical in nature.  Court music and performances known as khon and lakhon feature the most elaborate costuming and dance.  Khon and lakhon originated from the Khmer court and spread throughout the region, beginning in Laos during the Lan Xang era. Typical performances included jataka tales, with the performances of the Pra Lak Pra Lam during Lao New Year in Luang Prabang being the most recognizable today.
The nineteenth century spurred the creation of lam luang or Lao opera.  Lam luang is a more theatrical version of lam music complete with sets, costumes and orchestral accompaniment.  In 1972 the Pathet Lao formed the Central Lao Opera, the first professional lam luang troupe in Laos.  The performances center on social issues, traditional themes, and national propaganda.

Dance

The national folk dance in Laos is the lam vong. The lam vong begins with an individual using head and hand movements based on Buddhist mudras, who is then joined by a partner, and then by other couples until a crowd forms with three interconnected and slowly turning circles.

Performance based dances from the royal courts are rare, with highly symbolic movements and steps by female dancers.  In the 1980s many of the royal court dancers from Luang Prabang fled the Pathet Lao government to relocate in Nashville, Tennessee. Other traditional performance dances include the "fon dhab" or “sword dance” which is a dance display of men's martial arts. 
There are a number of folk dances which are popular with Lao Theung and Lao Sung groups, which have heavily adopted traditional Lao dance features. The Hmong perform the "fon bun kin chieng" or Hmong “New Year dance;” the Khmu have a courtship dance known as the "fon pao bang"; the Red and Black Tai have a bamboo cane dance, and the Yao are known for bell and drum dances.  There are numerous regional and ethnic variations on all traditional dances in Laos.

Film
Laos has little film or media industry.  Television, film, radio and internet media from neighboring Thailand is wide spread and is a source of political and cultural tension.  Prior to the 1950s in Laos only documentary French photographs and rarer film footage existed.  In the 1960s the Royal Lao Government produced the first feature films in Laos, Khukhak Peunkhaen “The True and Untrue Friend,” and Phaenedin Khong Hao “Our Land.” 
  
During the 1970s and 1980s propaganda films were common and the Ministry of Culture took over all production. A number of American movies were set in Laos during this period, but not filmed there, and concentrated on the Vietnam War era perspective.  Among American documentaries about Laos the Nerakhoon or “The Betrayal,” is widely known and follows a family that fled Laos in the 1970s and follows their post-Vietnam War story in the United States.

In 2007 the full-length feature movie Sabaidee Luang Prabang “Good Morning Luang Prabang” was released by Thai director Sakchai Deenan about a Thai photographer who falls in love with a Lao tour guide.  Also in 2007, the Australian documentary Bomb Harvest was released to critical acclaim. The documentary follows the Mines Advisory Group and Lao National Unexploded Ordnance Programme in their efforts to clear the country of unexploded bombs from the wars of the twentieth century.  The film portrays in graphic detail the difficulties of bomb removal in Laos, including the dangers faced by the poor population who dig the scrap metal for resale.

Australian filmmaker Kim Mordount's first feature film was made in Laos and features a Laotian cast speaking their native language. Entitled The Rocket, the film appeared at the 2013 Melbourne International Film Festival (MIFF) and won three awards at the Berlin International Film Festival: Best First Feature, the Amnesty International Film Prize and the Crystal Bear for Best Film in the Generation K-plus program.

Traditional clothing

Traditional clothing serves as the key visual cue for establishing belonging among ethnic groups. The techniques, patterns and materials vary not only by region and ethnicity, but even by clan and family.

For the Lao Loum, traditional dress is similar to outfits as their neighbors, however, it is more distinct and unique due to their rich textile history.  Among men, the Lao traditionally wear a Khmer style billowed trouser or sampot, a Mandarin collar jacket or Indochinese shirt, and a simple pha biang or checkered shawl.  Among older generations and areas of the north it is also not uncommon to see men wearing a checkered or plaid pha-sarong. For women, the traditional dress is a long skirt with a richly embroidered foot called a sinh, a matching pha biang or shawl (longer shawls called hom are worn in colder areas), and is worn with a French inspired blouse.  Men and women wear religious amulets, and large amounts of gold and silver jewelry which is believed to ward off evil and is a conspicuous sign of wealth. Colors patterns and embroidery techniques distinguish both region and class. Lao Loum use silk almost exclusively in many of their traditional designs. Traditional Lao clothing can also be found in the Northeast region of Thailand as the area was historically part of the Lan Xang kingdom and the people are majority, ethnically and culturally Lao.

Among Lao Theung, cotton materials are widely used. Khmu women are known for simple cotton sarongs with horizontal stripes, and long sleeved black blouses. Among Katu and Alak there is a tradition of adding significant amounts of beadwork and silver coins.  Lao Theung use silver and brass jewelry in large amounts both to ward off evil and signify status.

Lao Sung groups including the Hmong, Yao and Akha are known for elaborate embroidery, extensive silver ornamentation, and intricate color based patterns. For example, Blue Hmong women wear pleated skirts with bands of red, white, and blue embroidery; and a black jacket with orange and yellow embroidery. Yao women by contrast wear a long black jacket with red lapels, loose pants, and elaborately embroidered black turbans. Men typically wear black pants tied with an embroidered band, a French inspired Indochinese shirt, and a colorful headband.

Cuisine

Lao cuisine reflects the ethnic diversity of the country and its surrounding neighbors.  Laos has strong regional variations even among common dishes, with glutinous rice (sticky rice) being the staple of most meals.

A common Lao meal would consist of a richly spiced minced fish or chicken salad or larb, served with sticky rice; a jaew or paste made of chili peppers for dipping; tam mak hung a fiery and sour fresh green papaya salad, a broth based soup like kaeng no mai (bamboo soup); fresh herbs and vegetables served raw; tropical fruit as a dessert; and is served with the local beer or lao-lao rice liquor.

Lao cuisine is similar to Thai, but with several notable differences. Many Lao dishes have been adopted by Thais through the migration of Lao people throughout their country. The Lao meal as a whole generally appeals to more extremes of sourness, bitterness, and spice than in Thai cuisine.  Lao cooking uses copious amounts of mak phaet (chilies), pa daek or fermented fresh water fish sauce, kaffir lime leaves, and galangal in greater amounts to add bolder flavors to most dishes. Glutinous rice is eaten almost exclusively in ethnically Lao areas.

The Lao also have a greater consumption of wild game and insects known commonly as “jungle food.” Freshly killed game is sometimes eaten raw in richly spiced dishes and is seen as a delicacy.  Insects can be eaten in a variety of forms, with the more pungent types being used as spices or substitutes, such as common red fire ants for lemon-like sourness in southern soups. Smaller game is typically barbecued and sold at roadside stands.

Vietnamese dishes like pho and spring rolls are extremely popular throughout the country. Ethnic Yunnanese Chinese food is common in Vientiane, and is reflected in the fried dough dishes which are commonly sold as street snacks. For most non-sticky rice based dishes, a fork and spoon can be used. Chopsticks can also be used for popular noodle dishes like khao poon and khao soi. Among the Hmong and Yao, who eat more varieties of long grain rice, eating with a fork and spoon is common.

The years of French colonialism have also given Laos a number of food items including the baguette or khao jii, as well as omelets, pâté and croissants.  The French also introduced coffee cultivation, with the strong variety found in southern Laos near Ban Paxong as the most desired.  The common Lao breakfast reflects French influence and is a simple affair of strong coffee served hot or iced, and is taken with a baguette or other pastry which dipped in condensed milk.

Sports
Football is the most common international sport enjoyed in Laos, with play hosted at the Lao National Stadium in Vientiane.  The Lao League was founded in 1995, and fields ten teams. The Lao Football Federation operates a national team within the Asia division of FIFA.

Traditional sports include kickboxing martial arts, which are known collectively as muay Lao, are similar to the more popular muay Thai and their Khmer antecedents of bokator and pradal serey.

Ka-taw or kick-volleyball is also a traditional Lao sport, where players use a rattan ball and advance play using their feet, knees, chest and head.

The end of “Buddhist Lent” or Phansa is marked by boat races on the Mekong River.  There are traditional races where villages will each sponsor a team, with a celebration at a designated host village.  There are also sport races where rowing teams compete against each other in head-to-head races.

The increase of eco-tourism, has marked Laos as a destination for extreme sports.  Laos hosts over twenty national parks, with hiking, biking, whitewater rafting, canoeing, kayaking, caving, rappelling and zip-lining being increasingly common activities.

International competitions
The 25th Southeast Asian Games were held at Vientiane, in December 2009.

Laos first begin competing at the Olympics in 1980, and has since sent athletes to compete in: 1988, 1992, 1996, 2000, 2004, 2008 and 2012. Laos has also sent paralympians since the 2000 games in Sydney, Australia.  Laos has competed in the marathon, swimming, archery, and other track events. Laos has yet to win an Olympic medal.

Festivals and public holidays 

Lao festivals are traditionally based on the lunar calendar and vary each year on the exact date. The largest public festival is the four-day celebration of Lao New Year, or Pi Mai.

References

External links 

Events & Festivals in Laos (Department of Tourism Marketing of Ministry of Information, Culture and Tourism)